Anania crocealis is a species of moth of the family Crambidae. It was described by Jacob Hübner in 1796 and is found in Europe.

The wingspan is 22–25 mm. Forewings yellow-ochreous ; lines fuscous, first curved, second curved, strongly sinuate inwards below middle ; orbicular dot and linear discal mark fuscous ; a dark fuscous terminal line. Hindwings whitish grey, with faint darker second line. Larva dull green ; dorsal line dark greenish-grey ; head black.

The larvae feed on Pulicaria dysenterica, Inula conyzae and Inula salicina. The moth flies from June to September depending on the location.

References

External links 

 Waarneming.nl 
 Lepidoptera of Belgium
 Ebulea crocealis at UKMoths

Pyraustinae
Moths described in 1796
Moths of Europe